Yusif Museibovich Kerimov (25 October 1926, Lankaran – 29 November 1997, Baku) was an Azerbaijani-Soviet electrical engineer and a renowned inventor, one of the founders of the Azerbaijani Hydro-Electrical industry.

He graduated from Azerbaijan Industrial Institute in 1948. From 1968 to 1980, he was a Minister of Energetics of Azerbaijan SSR, heading The Power Engineering And Electrification Department of Azerbaijan SSR, which was later transformed into the Azerbaijan Power Engineering and Electrification (Azglavenergo) Head Production ("Азглавэнерго", currently "Azerenergy"). He is an author of numerous research papers, articles and patents, which to this day are used worldwide, including Azerbaijan, USA, Canada, Australia, Japan and other countries. He has been awarded an "Honorable Energetician of USSR" (Почетный энергетик СССР) and an "Honorable Engineer of Azerbaijan" titles.

Awards and titles
 "Honorable Energetician of USSR" (Почетный энергетик СССР)
 "Honorable Engineer of Azerbaijan".

See also
List of Azerbaijanis
Azerenergy

Selected publications
 US 3992566 (A), Aerodynamic aerial conductor vibration damper, KERIMOV JUSIF MUSEIBOVICH, 16 November 1976

References
 "Энергетика буксует на мазуте", "Неделя", 23 March 2001

External links
 Azerenergy Official website
 About Azerenergy
 Patent Citations (Google Patents)
 Justia Patents
 Land Of Free
 WikiPatents
 Patent Genius
 Aerodynamic aerial conductor vibration damper (USA)
 Aerodynamic aerial conductor vibration damper (Canada)
 AERODYNAMIC AERIAL CONDUCTOR VIBRATION DAMPER (Canada)
 Directory Patent
 Aerodynamic aerial conductor vibration damper
 Patnet on Aerodynamic aerial conductor vibration damper (02-Aug-1977)
 AERODYNAMIC AERIAL CONDUCTOR VIBRATION DAMPER
 Aerodynamic aerial conductor vibration damper
 AERODYNAMIC AERIAL CONDUCTOR VIBRATION DAMPER
 Aerodynamic aerial conductor vibration damper
 Aerodynamic aerial conductor vibration damper - United States Patent 3992566
 Aerodynamic aerial conductor vibration damper
 Aerodynamic aerial conductor vibration damper
 Aerodynamic aerial conductor vibration damper - United States Patent 3992566

Azerbaijani engineers
Azerbaijani inventors
People from Lankaran
1926 births
1997 deaths
Soviet inventors